Kevin Dale Long (born May 2, 1975) is a former American football center who played four seasons in the National Football League with the Tennessee Oilers/Titans. He started in Super Bowl XXXIV.

Early life and college
Long graduated from Summerville High School of his birthplace Summerville, South Carolina in 1993. As a high school football player, Long earned honorable mention All-America honors from USA Today. After redshirting the 1993 season, Long lettered in football for four seasons (1994–1997) at Florida State University.

Professional career

References

1975 births
Living people
People from Summerville, South Carolina
American football centers
Florida State Seminoles football players
Tennessee Oilers players
Tennessee Titans players
Players of American football from South Carolina